Associazione Sportiva Dilettantistica Virtus Pavullese is an Italian association football club located in Pavullo nel Frignano, Emilia-Romagna. It currently plays in Serie D.

History
The club was founded in 1993 after the merger between Unione Sportiva Pavullese Olimpia (historic city team founded in 1919) and Virtus Real Pavullese 91 (founded in 1991), either played in Promozione Emilia–Romagna.

Colors and badge 
The colors of the club are white and green.

References

External links
Official homepage 

Football clubs in Italy
Association football clubs established in 1993
Football clubs in Emilia-Romagna
1993 establishments in Italy